During the 2003–04 English football season, Nottingham Forest competed in the Football League First Division.

Season summary
The 2003–2004 season saw Paul Hart suffer from a squad that was low in confidence and with no money. However, Forest started reasonably well, winning five of their first seven games and after 15 games, they won seven and lost five and were in the top half of the table. Unfortunately, when they went into the bottom three, after going 14 games without a win, the Forest chairman Nigel Doughty called time on Hart's reign as Forest manager.

Joe Kinnear was then brought in to replace Hart. The club's directors looked to have made a good decision when Kinnear revitalised Forest, bringing out the best in key players like Michael Dawson and Andy Reid, and they climbed up the table to secure a safe 14th place.

Final league table

Results
Nottingham Forest's score comes first

Legend

Football League First Division

FA Cup

League Cup

First-team squad

Left club during season

Appearances

References

2003-04
Nottingham Forest